Oxynoemacheilus seyhanicola is a species of ray-finned fish in the genus Oxynoemacheilus. It is endemic to an estimated 60 km of the lower Seyhan river near Adana in Turkey where it can be found in moderately fast currents with a gravel substrate. It is threatened by dams, water extraction and climate change.

Footnotes 

seyhanicola
Endemic fauna of Turkey
Fish described in 2007
Taxa named by Füsun Erk'akan
Taxa named by Teodor T. Nalbant
Taxa named by Cevher Özeren